Inka Parei (born 1967 in Frankfurt) is a German writer who lives in Berlin. She studied sociology, political science, sinology and German studies. Parei won the 2003 Ingeborg Bachmann Prize for excerpts from her book Was Dunkelheit war.

Works
Was Dunkelheit war, Roman, Schöffling, Frankfurt/Main 2005, 169 S. 
Die Besten 2003 : Klagenfurter Texte / die 27. Tage der Deutschsprachigen Literatur in Klagenfurt (compiler-editor Iris Radisch)
Die Schattenboxerin, Roman, 1999; TB Frankfurt/Main 2001,

Translations
 Chinese Da Taijiquan de Nühai（打太極拳的女孩）, 2002
 French La boxeuse d'ombres, 2001
 Italian La ragazza che fa a pugni con l'ombra, 2004
 Polish Krotiteljica sjenki, 2004
 Swedish Skuggboxerskan, 2001
 Serbian Krotiteljka senki, 2004
 Spanish La luchadora de sombras, 2002
 Bulgarian Улична боксьорка, 2007

References

1967 births
Writers from Frankfurt
Living people
Ingeborg Bachmann Prize winners
German women writers